Aleksandr Grigoryevich Nazarchuk (6 August 1939 – 1 February 2021) was a Russian politician. He served as Minister of Agriculture and Chairman of the Altai Krai Legislative Assembly.

Biography
Nazarchuk graduated from Altai State Agricultural University and earned a PhD. in biological sciences. In 1964, he began working as an inspector-general for collective farm management before overseeing all farm production in the Romanovsky District. From 1977 to 1985, he served as First Secretary of the Romanovsky District Committee of the Communist Party of the Soviet Union (CPSU), and from 1985 to 1987 he served as First Secretary of the Shipunovsky District Committee of the CPSU.

In 1990, Nazarchuk was elected to the Congress of People's Deputies of Russia, serving until the Congress' disbanding in 1993. That year, he was elected to the State Duma as a member of the Agrarian Party of Russia (APR). He then served as Minister of Agriculture from 27 October 1994 to 12 January 1996 and was Chairman of the Altai Krai Legislative Assembly from 31 March 1996 to 3 March 2008. He was also an honorary member of the Federation Council from 1996 to 2001.

In 2005, Nazarchuk became a political rival of Altai Krai Governor Mikhail Evdokimov. Evdokimov was impeached as Governor in March, although he passed the vote of no confidence, and died in a car accident in August of that year.

Nazarchuk announced his resignation as Chairman of the Altai Krai Legislative Assembly due to differences with deputies.

Aleksandr Nazarchuk died in Solnechnoye on 1 February 2021, at the age of 81.

Awards
Order "For Merit to the Fatherland" (1999)
Order of the Badge of Honour
Order of the Red Banner of Labour
Order of Merit for the Altai Territory (2009)
Order of Ivan Kalita (2008)
Gratitude of the President of the Russian Federation (1995)

References

1939 births
2021 deaths
20th-century Russian politicians
21st-century Russian politicians
People from Altai Krai
Communist Party of the Soviet Union members
Agrarian Party of Russia politicians
Agriculture ministers of Russia
First convocation members of the State Duma (Russian Federation)
Members of the Federation Council of Russia (1996–2000)